Aphomomyrmex is a genus of ants in the subfamily Formicinae. It contains the single species Aphomomyrmex afer, known from Africa (Cameroon and South Africa). The genus is closely related to Petalomyrmex.

References

External links

Formicinae
Monotypic ant genera
Hymenoptera of Africa